Carolyn S. Gordon (born 1950) is a mathematician and Benjamin Cheney Professor of Mathematics at Dartmouth College. She is most well known for giving a negative answer to the question "Can you hear the shape of a drum?" in her work with David Webb and Scott A. Wolpert. She is a Chauvenet Prize winner and a 2010 Noether Lecturer.

Early life and education
Gordon received her Bachelor of Science degree from the Purdue University. She entered graduate studies at the Washington University in St. Louis, earning her Doctor of Philosophy in mathematics in 1979. Her doctoral advisor was Edward Nathan Wilson and her thesis was on isometry groups of homogeneous manifolds. She completed a postdoc at Technion Israel Institute of Technology and held positions at Lehigh University and Washington University in St. Louis.

Career

Gordon is most well known for her work in isospectral geometry, for which hearing the shape of a drum is the prototypical example.  In 1966 Mark Kac asked whether the shape of a drum could be determined by the sound it makes (whether a Riemannian manifold is determined by the spectrum of its Laplace–Beltrami operator). John Milnor observed that a theorem due to Witt implied the existence of a pair of 16-dimensional tori that have the same spectrum but different shapes. However, the problem in two dimensions remained open until 1992, when Gordon, with coauthors Webb and Wolpert, constructed a pair of regions in the Euclidean plane that have different shapes but identical eigenvalues  (see figure on right).  In further work, Gordon and Webb produced convex isospectral domains in the hyperbolic plane and in Euclidean space.

Gordon has written or coauthored over 30 articles on isospectral geometry including work on isospectral closed Riemannian manifolds with a common Riemannian covering.  These isospectral Riemannian manifolds have the same local geometry but different topology.  They can be found using the "Sunada method," due to Toshikazu Sunada.  In 1993 she found isospectral Riemannian manifolds which are not locally isometric and, since that time, has worked with coauthors to produce a number of other such examples.

Gordon has also worked on projects concerning the homology class, length spectrum (the collection of lengths of all closed geodesics, together with multiplicities) and geodesic flow on isospectral Riemannian manifolds.

Selected awards and honors

In 2001 Gordon and Webb were awarded the Mathematical Association of America Chauvenet Prize for their 1996 American Scientist paper, "You can't hear the shape of a drum". In 1990 she was awarded an AMS Centennial Fellowship by the American Mathematical Society for outstanding early career research. In 1999 Gordon presented an AMS-MAA joint invited address. In 2010 she was selected as a Noether Lecturer. In 2012 she became a fellow of the American Mathematical Society and of the American Association for the Advancement of Science. In 2017 she was selected as a fellow of the Association for Women in Mathematics in the inaugural class. Gordon was featured in the Women's History Month tribute in the March 2018 edition of the AMS Notices.

Selected articles

Personal life
Gordon is married to David Webb. She cites raising her daughter, Annalisa, as her greatest joy in life.

External links
 
 Noether Announcement in July/Aug 2009 AWM Newsletter
 Carolyn S. Gordon

References

20th-century American mathematicians
21st-century American mathematicians
American women mathematicians
Fellows of the American Association for the Advancement of Science
Fellows of the American Mathematical Society
1950 births
Living people
Place of birth missing (living people)
Fellows of the Association for Women in Mathematics
20th-century women mathematicians
21st-century women mathematicians
Dartmouth College faculty
Purdue University alumni
Washington University in St. Louis alumni
Washington University in St. Louis mathematicians
Differential geometers
21st-century American women